The Melvin School is a former homestead located at 4950 S. Laredo St. in Aurora, Colorado. It was moved to its current site from its original location, 3 miles away. It was built in 1922.

The structure has undergone extensive renovation, including a rebuilding of the belfry, which was done using old pictures as a guide. Inside the structure, there is a museum and library in one room and an authentically-restored classroom that shows the interior of a typical rural school from the 1920s.

See also
National Register of Historic Places listings in Arapahoe County, Colorado

References

External links 
History Colorado webpage about the school

Buildings and structures in Aurora, Colorado
Buildings and structures in Arapahoe County, Colorado
Historic districts on the National Register of Historic Places in Colorado
National Register of Historic Places in Arapahoe County, Colorado
School buildings completed in 1922
1922 establishments in Colorado
School buildings on the National Register of Historic Places in Colorado